Henri Konow (7 February 1862 – 18 January 1939) was a Danish naval officer, vice-admiral, and the last governor of the Danish West Indies, overseeing the transfer of administration to the United States of America following the Treaty of the Danish West Indies in 1916 under which the Kingdom of Denmark sold the islands now named the US Virgin Islands to the United States in exchange for US$25,000,000 in gold.

Early life
Henri Konow was born on 7 February 1862 in Copenhagen, Denmark, the son of the diplomat and ship-owner Hans Jacob Hesselberg Konow and Ida Marie West.

Career
Konow started his naval career in 1879 as a cadet in the Danish Navy, advancing to the rank of second lieutenant after 4 years on 30 August 1883. He continued ascending through the naval ranks until becoming a vice-admiral in 1923, four years before his retirement. Furthermore,  he was made a knight of the Order of the Dannebrog on 28 October 1895; he gradually progressed through the ranks of the Order and was finally awarded the Grand Cross of the Order 1925.

Commander with Grand Cross of the Royal Swedish Order of the Sword 1926  (Commander 1st Class 1922;  Chevalier 2nd Class 1893).

World War I
On 3 October 1916, he was named acting governor, to oversee the transfer of authority to the United States on 31 March 1917.

Easter Crisis
During the Easter Crisis of 1920, Konow was Foreign Minister and Defence Minister of Denmark in the Cabinet of Otto Liebe.

Personal life
He married Jacobine Cathrine Margrethe Worsaae on 21 October 1892 at the Church of Holmen in his native city, Copenhagen, Denmark. In 1893, he published an autobiography.

External links 
 Biography at navalhistory.dk

Danish admirals
Governors of the Danish West Indies
1862 births
1939 deaths
Danish Defence Ministers
Foreign ministers of Denmark
People from Copenhagen
20th century in the Danish West Indies
20th-century Danish politicians